Wan Chun Cheng or Zheng Wanjun (1908–1987) was a Chinese botanist. Initially one of the Chinese plant collectors who followed in the wake of the Europeans after 1920, he became one of the world's leading authorities on the taxonomy of gymnosperms. Working at the National Central University in Nanjing, he was instrumental in the identification  in 1944 of the dawn redwood, Metasequoia glyptostroboides previously known only from fossils. The plant Juniperus chengii is named in his honour.

References 

1908 births
1987 deaths
20th-century Chinese botanists
Biologists from Jiangsu
Botanists with author abbreviations
Members of the Chinese Academy of Sciences
Scientists from Xuzhou
Academic staff of the National Central University